Veja Mate is a German 402 MW offshore wind farm in the German Bight of the North Sea about 95 km northwest of Borkum. The wind farm consists of 67 Siemens Wind Power SWT-6.0-154 turbines, each with a 6 MW capacity.

In January 2017, 18 months after the financial close, the first of the turbines started delivering power to the German grid. The last turbine was installed on 25 May 2017, and commissioning activities were completed on 31 May 2017. Construction was completed in less than 23 months after financial close, almost four months ahead of the schedule agreed at financial close.

The EUR 1.9 billion (US$2.1bn) wind farm is owned by Siemens Financial Services and a consortium of European investors.

The power is delivered via the offshore converter station HVDC BorWin2 to the German onshore Diele substation near Weener.

See also

Wind power in Germany
List of offshore wind farms

References

External links

Wind farms in Germany
Offshore wind farms in the North Sea
Energy infrastructure completed in 2017
2017 establishments in Germany